Forte is a script typeface designed by Austrian commercial artist Carl Reissberger on May 8, 1962, for the Monotype Corporation. It started in Windows Vista and ended in 8.1.

Design
The idea for the script face came from the study of plants, individual letterforms being inspired by the long stems and furry heads of the reed. It is intended to give a contrast to sans-serif and classical modern types. Adobe suggests the optimal viewing size to 18.0 points.

Unicode
Forte has characters in the following Unicode ranges:

References

External links
 Identifont - Forte
 Fonts In Use

See also 

 Typeface

Typefaces and fonts introduced in 1962
Microsoft typefaces
Script typefaces
Display typefaces